Ayşegül is a Turkish given name for females. The name is derived from "Ayşe", the Turkish form for the Arabic name Aisha, meaning "she who lives," plus "Gül," a Persian word meaning rose."

Notable women named Ayşegül include:
Ayşegül Abadan (born 1980), Turkish pianist
Ayşegül Acevit (born 1968), Turkish–German writer
Ayşegül Aldinç (born 1957), Turkish singer and actress
Ayşegül Behlivan, Turkish Muay Thai and wushu practitioner.
Ayşegül Çoban (born 1992), Turkish weightlifter
Ayşegül Ergin, Turkish Taekwondo practitioner
Ayşegül Günay (born 1992), Turkish basketball player
Ayşegül Pehlivanlar (born 1979), Turkish Paralympic sport shooter

Other use
 , Liberia-flagged Turkish powership

References

Turkish feminine given names